Pucarani Municipality is the first municipal section of the Los Andes Province in the  La Paz Department, Bolivia. Its seat is Pucarani.

It is bordered to the north by the Batallas Municipality, to the east by the Pedro Domingo Murillo Province, to the south by the Laja Municipality and to the west by the Ingavi Province and Lake Titicaca.

Geography 
The Cordillera Real traverses the Pucarani Municipality. One of the highest peaks of the municipality is Kunturiri. Other mountains are listed below:

Division 
The municipality consists of the following twelve cantons:
 Catavi Canton - 741 inhabitants (2001)
 Chojasivi Canton - 1,444 inhabitants
 Cohana Canton - 1,679 inhabitants
 Lacaya Canton - 2,067 inhabitants
 Patamanta Canton - 3,116 inhabitants
 Pucarani Canton - 5,325 inhabitants
 Villa Ascensión de Chipamaya Canton - 1,271 inhabitants
 Villa Iquiaca Canton - 1,555 inhabitants
 Villa Pabón Chiarpata Canton - 844 inhabitants
 Villa Rosario de Corapata Canton - 3,625 inhabitants
 Villa Vilaque Canton - 2,903 inhabitants
 Huayna Potosí Canton - 2,232 inhabitants

See also 
 Allqa Quta
 Ch'iyar Quta
 Juri Quta
 Katari River
 Laram Quta
 Sura Quta (Patamanta)
 Sura Quta (Wayna Potosí)
 Taypi Chaka Quta

References

External links 
 Pucarani Municipality: population data and map (PDF; 647 kB) (Spanish)

Municipalities of La Paz Department (Bolivia)